The 1999 European Promotion Cup for Junior Women was the second edition of the basketball European Promotion Cup for U18 women's teams, today known as FIBA U18 Women's European Championship Division C. It was played in Nicosia, Cyprus, from 28 July to 1 August 1999. Scotland women's national under-18 basketball team won the tournament.

Participating teams

First round

Group A

Group B

5th–7th place playoffs

Championship playoffs

Final standings

References

1999
1999–2000 in European women's basketball
FIBA U18
Sports competitions in Cyprus
FIBA